Rhododendron fauriei is a rhododendron species native to Japan and Korea.  Its flower's colors are light red to white.

References 
 The Plant List
 Hirsutum.com

fauriei